The Gyulai István Memorial is an annual track and field meet that takes place at Bregyó közi Regionális Atlétika Központ in Székesfehérvár, Hungary. It was first held in 2011 at the Ferenc Puskás Stadium in Budapest. The meeting is currently part of the IAAF Hammer Throw Challenge. The event is named after István Gyulai, who died in 2006, and served as secretary of the IAAF.

Meeting records

Men

Women

References

External links
Official website
Meeting records 

European Athletic Association meetings
Recurring sporting events established in 2011
Athletics competitions in Hungary
Sport in Székesfehérvár